Albert Bosomtwi-Sam (25 May 1954- 4 August 1998)  was a Ghanaian lawyer and politician. He belonged to the National Democratic Congress (NDC). Bosomtwi-Sam started the Bosumtwi - Sam & Associates Law Firm in Takoradi in the Western Region. He served as Member of Parliament for the Sekondi Constituency from 1992 to 1996. He served as Chief whip of the NDC in the first  parliament of the fourth republic of Ghana. Also he served as the deputy Minister of Interior.

Early life and education 
Albert Bosomtwi-Sam was born on May 25, 1954, in the Western Region of Ghana. He attended Mfantsipim School in Cape Coast. He went to the University of Ghana and the Ghana School of Law where he obtained respectively his Bachelor of Laws and the Barrister-at-Law.

Politics 
Albert Bosomtwi-Sam was elected during the 1992 Ghanaian parliamentary election as member of the first parliament of the fourth republic of Ghana on the ticket of the National Democratic Congress. Joseph E. Arbuah was a former member of the Secondi constituency in 1979. Albert contested the seat again in 1996 Ghanaian general election, unfortunately he lost against Papa Owusu-Ankomah of the New Patriotic Party (NPP) who polled 28,802 votes representing 53.80% of the share over his opponents Albert Bosomtwi-Sam who polled 14,990 votes representing 28.00% of the share and Anthony Ackah of the People's National Convention (PNC) who polled 715 votes representing 1.30% of the share.

Fishing harbour
A fishing harbour in Sekondi was named after him. The Albert Bosomtwi-Sam Fishing Harbour is operated by the Ghana Ports and Harbours Authority.

Personal life 
He was a Christian.

Death 
He died on the 4 of August 1998.

References

National Democratic Congress (Ghana) politicians
20th-century Ghanaian lawyers
Ghana School of Law alumni
1998 deaths
University of Ghana alumni
Ghanaian Christians
1954 births
People from Western Region (Ghana)
Ghanaian MPs 1993–1997